The Mochokidae are a family of catfishes (order Siluriformes) that are known as the squeakers and upside-down catfish (although not all species swim upside-down). There are nine genera and about 200 species of mochokids. All the mochokids are freshwater species originating from Africa.

They have three pairs of barbels, with the nasal barbels absent; sometimes, the mandibular barbels may be branched. The lips are modified into a suckermouth in Atopochilus, Chiloglanis, and Euchilichthys. The adipose fin is usually very long. The dorsal and pectoral fins have spines that are usually strong and with a locking mechanism. They range in size up to  SL. This group contains many popular species among aquarists, such as Synodontis nigriventris, Synodontis angelicus, and Synodontis multipunctatus.

References

External links
 Tree of Life Mochokidae

 

Catfish families
Taxa named by David Starr Jordan